Prima is a monotypic genus of East African tree trunk spiders containing the single species, Prima ansieae. It was first described by S. H. Foord in 2008, and has only been found on Madagascar.

References

Hersiliidae
Spiders described in 2008
Spiders of Madagascar